Paronymus, the large darts, is an Afrotropical genus of grass skippers in the family Hesperiidae.

Species
Paronymus budonga (Evans, 1938)
Paronymus ligora (Hewitson, 1876)
Paronymus nevea (Druce, 1910)
Paronymus xanthias (Mabille, 1891)

Former species
Paronymus xanthioides (Holland, 1892) - transferred to Xanthonymus xanthioides (Holland, 1892)

References

External links
Natural History Museum Lepidoptera genus database
 Seitz, A. Die Gross-Schmetterlinge der Erde 13: Die Afrikanischen Tagfalter. Plate XIII 79

Erionotini
Hesperiidae genera